Cicadatrini is a tribe of cicadas in the family Cicadidae. There are at least 120 described species in Cicadatrini.

Members of Cicadatrini are found in the Palearctic and Indomalaya. The genus Pachypsaltria is found in South America, and may not belong in this tribe.

Genera
The following genera belong to the tribe Cicadatrini:

 Chloropsalta Haupt, 1920 c g
 Cicadatra Kolenati, 1857 c g
 Emathia Stål, 1866 c g
 Klapperichicen Dlabola, 1957 c g
 Mogannia Amyot & Audinet-Serville, 1843 c g
 Pachypsaltria Stål, 1861 i c g
 Psalmocharias Kirkaldy, 1908 c g
 Shaoshia Wei, Ahmed & Rizvi, 2010 c g
 Taungia Ollenbach, 1929 c g
 Triglena Fieber, 1875 c g
 Vagitanus Distant, 1918 c g

Data sources: i = ITIS, c = Catalogue of Life, g = GBIF, b = Bugguide.net

References

Further reading

External links

 

 
Cicadettinae
Hemiptera tribes